Martina Hingis and Sabine Lisicki defeated Ekaterina Makarova and Elena Vesnina in the final, 4–6, 6–4, [10–5] to win the women's doubles tennis title at the 2014 Miami Open. It was their first title together, and they saved 7 match points en route, in the quarterfinals. With the victory, Lisicki claimed her third doubles title overall, while it was the 38th for Hingis, and the first since her second professional comeback in the summer of 2013. The pair entered the tournament via a wildcard.

Nadia Petrova and Katarina Srebotnik were the defending champions, but did not participate together. Petrova partnered Bethanie Mattek-Sands, but the team withdrew before the first round due to Mattek-Sands's hip injury. Srebotnik partnered Květa Peschke, but lost in the quarterfinals to Cara Black and Sania Mirza.

Seeds

Draw

Finals

Top half

Bottom half

References 
General

 

Specific

Sony Open Tennis - Doubles
2014 Sony Open Tennis
Women in Florida